Maricopa coquimbella is a species of snout moth in the genus Maricopa. It was described by Ragonot in 1888. It is found in Chile.

References

Moths described in 1888
Phycitinae
Endemic fauna of Chile